Events from the year 1872 in China.

Incumbents
 Tongzhi Emperor (12th year)
 Regent: Empress Dowager Cixi

Events
 Miao Rebellion (1854–73)
 Dungan Revolt (1862–77)
 Panthay Rebellion
 Tongzhi Restoration

Establishments 

 Yusan Hall
 Dongquan Lighthouse
 Shen Bao

Births 

 Fok Hing Tong, businesswoman
 Li Shouxin (possibly)

Deaths 

 Du Wenxiu
 Zeng Guofan, (1811 – 1872) mysteriously dies in Hong Xiuquan's former mansion